Alicia Esteve Head (born July 31, 1973) is a Spanish woman who claimed to be a survivor of the attacks on the World Trade Center on September 11, 2001, under the name Tania Head. She joined the World Trade Center Survivors' Network support group, later becoming its president. Her name was regularly mentioned in media reports of the attacks. In 2007, it was revealed Head's story was a hoax; she was not in New York City on September 11, 2001, but in reality was attending classes in her native city, Barcelona.

Background
Alicia Esteve Head was born on July 31, 1973, in Barcelona, Spain. Head came from a prominent Barcelona family that was involved in a 1992 financial scandal for which her father and brother served prison terms. She attended the University of Barcelona and worked for Hotel de la Villa Olímpica S.A., a Spanish hotel company. She later worked in Barcelona as a management secretary from 1998 to 2000 and was enrolled in a master's degree program at ESADE in 2001 when the September 11 attacks took place.

World Trade Center Survivors' Network
Head traveled to the U.S. for the first time in 2003. The following year, she joined the World Trade Center Survivors' Network after Gerry Bogacz, one of its founders, learned through word of mouth that a woman named "Tania Head" had developed an online support group for 9/11 survivors. After many months of email correspondence with Bogacz, she merged their groups. The network's purpose was to provide support for survivors of the attacks, as most public support was paid to a select group of victims, victims' families and first responders; the organization intended to bring together and support those who were also affected by the attacks, including civilians present at the World Trade Center as well as the personnel and volunteers involved in the extensive rescue and recovery efforts afterward. Head was never paid for these activities, nor for her involvement with the Survivors' Network, and in fact donated money to the group.

Head claimed to have been inside the South Tower (WTC 2) when United Airlines Flight 175 hit, crawling through smoke and flames on the 78th floor and sustaining severe burns to her arm. If true, this would have made her one of only nineteen people at or above the point of impact to have survived. Head claimed that her fiancé Dave was killed in the North Tower (WTC 1), though in later tellings of the story, she said that "Dave" was actually her husband. She also claimed that a dying man passed his wedding ring to her so it could be returned to his widow, and that she had been rescued by Welles Crowther, whose heroic actions on that day were widely reported in the media. Head was interviewed in the media, invited to speak at university conferences, and in 2005, was chosen to lead tours for the Tribute WTC Visitor Center, where she was photographed with New York City Mayor Michael Bloomberg, former Mayor Rudy Giuliani, and former New York Governor George Pataki. 
 
Head regularly recounted her claims to Ground Zero tour groups in vivid detail, saying, "I was there at the towers. I'm a survivor. I'm going to tell you about that." She was featured in retrospective 9/11 articles as a representative of the 20,000 surviving victims who escaped the damaged buildings. Richard Zimbler, her successor as president of the World Trade Center Survivors' Network, said, "There was no reason to doubt her story. She looked the part. She had a badly injured arm that appeared to have burn scars and her story was very, very realistic."

Claims disputed
In September 2007, The New York Times sought to verify key details of Head's story as part of an anniversary piece. Head claimed a degree from Harvard University and a graduate business degree from Stanford University, but those institutions had no record of her. She claimed she had been working at Merrill Lynch in the South Tower, but Merrill Lynch had no record of her employment, nor did Merrill Lynch have offices in the World Trade Center at the time of the attacks. Head backed out of three scheduled interviews, and later refused to speak to reporters at all. The Times then contacted other members of the Survivors’ Network, and raised questions about the veracity of Head's story.  By the week of September 27, 2007, the Network voted to remove her as president and as a director of the group.

Among other questionable elements of Head's story was her engagement to a man nicknamed "Big Dave", who had perished in the opposite tower. The man's family claimed to have never heard of Tania Head (the man's surname was withheld in the article, to respect his family's privacy).

The Barcelona newspaper La Vanguardia ultimately revealed that Head had been in class at ESADE in Barcelona during the 9/11 attacks, where she had told her classmates that her scarred arm was the result of an automobile accident, or alternatively a horse riding accident, many years earlier.  La Vanguardia reported that Head attended classes in the program until June 2002, and had told classmates she wanted to work in New York.

Aftermath
After Head's fraud was exposed, she declined all further interviews and abruptly left New York. In February 2008, an anonymous email was sent from a Spanish account to members of the World Trade Center Survivors Network, claiming that Head had died by suicide. This suicide claim turned out to be yet another lie. In 2012, a book and feature film documentary, both titled The Woman Who Wasn't There, told Head's story from inside the World Trade Center Survivors' Network, utilizing interviews with Head and members of the Network before and after her deception was revealed. Both the book and film noted that Head was seen with her mother in New York on September 14, 2011.

In July 2012, Head was fired from her position at Inter Partner Assistance, an insurance company in Barcelona, once her employers found out about her ruse in New York.

References

External links
 The Amazing, Untrue Story of a Sept. 11 Survivor

Impostors
Living people
1973 births
People associated with the September 11 attacks
Hoaxes in the United States
Hoaxes in Spain
2001 hoaxes
People from Catalonia
People from Barcelona
University of Barcelona alumni
ESADE alumni